Megh is a Hindustani classical raga. The meaning of Megh in Sanskrit is 'Cloud'. Hence this raga is mostly sung or played in the Monsoon season. Another raga which describes rain is raga Malhar. So these 2 ragas where merged and a new raga was developed, this raga is raga Megh Malhar. The Carnatic Music equivalent of this raga is Madhyamavati.

Theory 
Arohana & Avarohana

Arohana: 

Avarohana: 

Pakad

Vadi & Samavadi

In this raga vadi is Sa and samavadi is Pa - Re is used a lot but always sliding down from M, n always slides from P

Organization & Relationships

Related ragas: Ragas of Malhar family, namely Megh Malhar, Miyan ki Malhar, Gaud Malhar, Ramdasi Malhar, Dhuliya Malhar, etc. as well as Madhmad Sarang.
Thaat: Kafi.

Mixture

The meaning of Megh in Sanskrit is 'Cloud'. Hence this raga is mostly sung or played in the Monsoon season. Another raga which describes rain is raga Malhar. So these 2 ragas where merged and a new raga was developed, this raga is raga Megh Malhar. So raga Megh has mixture with raga Malhar which forms raga Megh Malhar.

Behavior 

Samay (Time)

Late night.

Seasonality

Raga Megh is commonly associated with the monsoon season. Because the meaning of Megh in Sanskrit is 'Cloud'. Hence this raga is mostly sung or played in the Monsoon season.

Rasa

Gambhir rasa

Historical Information 

Origins

This is one of the very old ragas found in Indian classical music.
This raga is related from Lord Krishna time period, when Govardhan Parvat (mountain) was on Lord Krishna's short finger during the Govardhan leela, then Lord Shiva generated a Damru sound to protect Lord Krishna. That sound which was generated by the Damru was raga MEGH....

Legend

There is legend stating that Tansen's physical agony after singing Raga Deepak (Poorvi Thaat) was pacified with listening to Raga Megh Malhar rendered by two sisters, Tana and Riri.

Film Songs 
A Few songs are composed in Raga Madhyamavathi, the Carnatic Equivalent of Megh

Language:Tamil

Important Recordings
 Amir Khan, Ragas Megh and Lalit, HMV LP (long-playing record), EMI-EASD1331
 Pt Ajoy Chakraborty -Raag Megh (https://www.youtube.com/watch?v=Sg6LDWgv4Tc)

References
The Raga Guide: A Survey of 74 Hindustani Ragas. Zenith Media, London: 1999.

''Ramashreya Jha explains difference between Sarang and Megh http://www.parrikar.org/hindustani/sarang/

External links 
 SRA on Samay and Ragas
 SRA on Ragas and Thaats
 Rajan Parrikar on Ragas
 More details about raga Megh

Megh